Drop Dead is a dice game in which the players try to gain the highest total score. The game was created in New York.

Five dice and paper to record players' scores are all that is needed. A player rolls the five dice and if the throw does not include a 2 or 5, they receive the score of the total numbers added together. That player is also able to roll the dice again. When a player rolls the dice and any of them contain a 2 or 5, they score no points and the dice that includes a 2 or 5 is excluded from any future throws that they make. A player's turn does not stop until their last remaining die shows a 2 or 5. At that point, the player "drops dead" and it becomes the next player's turn. The highest total score wins.

The textbook Understanding Probability uses the dice game in a math question about simulation.

References

Dice games